Luigi Velluti (1908 – 1985) was an Italian sculptor. His work was part of the sculpture event in the art competition at the 1936 Summer Olympics.

References

External links

1908 births
1985 deaths
20th-century Italian sculptors
20th-century Italian male artists
Italian male sculptors
Olympic competitors in art competitions
Place of birth missing